The 14th Cook Islands Parliament is the previous term of the Parliament of the Cook Islands. Its composition was determined by the 2014 elections on 9 July 2014.

Due to an election-night tie the seat of Mitiaro was initially left vacant. The tie was later resolved by a judicial recount, and Tangata Vavia was declared elected.

The Parliament sat for the first time on 8 October 2014.

The Speaker of the 14th Parliament is Niki Rattle. The Deputy Speaker is Rose Toki-Brown.

Members

Initial MPs

New members

Summary of changes
 Tangata Vavia was elected to the seat of Mitiaro in December 2014 following a judicial recount.
 On 15 March 2015 Albert Nicholas switched his support to the government in exchange for a Ministerial position.
 Mona Ioane was elected to the seat of Vaipae-Tautu in April 2015 following the 2015 Vaipae-Tautu by-election
 Pumati Israela was elected to the seat of Arutanga-Reureu-Nikaupara following the resignation of Teina Bishop.
 In April 2017 Albert Nicholas resigned from parliament in order to end speculation over his defection from the Democrats. He was re-elected in the resulting 2017 Avatiu–Ruatonga–Palmerston by-election.

References

Politics of the Cook Islands
2014 in the Cook Islands